South LeRoy Meeting House (also known as SE LeRoy Methodist Episcopal Church or Brakeman Church) is a historic church in Leroy Township, Ohio The Greek Revival architecture church was started in 1822 and finished in 1832. Henry Brakeman and sons built the church from local lumber. It was placed on the National Register in 1979. As of the fall of 2015, the Leroy South Meetinghouse is undergoing renovations. The entire building has now been resided and painted.

References

Methodist churches in Ohio
Churches on the National Register of Historic Places in Ohio
Religious buildings and structures completed in 1898
Churches in Lake County, Ohio
National Register of Historic Places in Lake County, Ohio
1898 establishments in Ohio